The Vilna Governorate (1795–1915; also known as Lithuania-Vilnius Governorate from 1801 until 1840; , Vilenskaya guberniya) or Government of Vilnius was a governorate of the Russian Empire created after the Third Partition of the Polish–Lithuanian Commonwealth in 1795. It was part of the Lithuanian General Governorate, which was called the Vilnius General Governorate after 1830, and was attached to the Northwestern Krai. The seat was in Vilnius (Vilna in Russian), where the Governors General resided.

History
The first governorates, Vilnius Governorate (consisting of eleven uyezds or districts) and Slonim Governorate, were established after the third partition of the Polish-Lithuanian Commonwealth. Just a year later, on December 12, 1796, by order of Tsar Paul I they were merged into one governorate, called the Lithuanian Governorate, with its capital in Vilnius. By order of Tsar Alexander I on September 9, 1801, the Lithuanian Governorate was split into the Lithuania-Vilnius Governorate and the Lithuania-Grodno Governorate. After 39 years, the word "Lithuania" was dropped from the two names by Nicholas I. 

In 1843, another administrative reform took place, creating the Kovno Governorate (Kovno in Russian) out of seven western districts of the Vilnius Governorate, including all of Samogitia. The Vilnius Governorate received three additional districts: Vileyka and Dzisna from the Minsk Governorate and Lida from Grodno Governorate. It was divided to districts of Vilnius, Trakai, Disna, Oshmyany, Lida, Vileyka and Sventiany. This arrangement remained unchanged until World War I. A part of the Vilnius Governorate was then included in the Lithuania District of Ober-Ost, formed by the occupying German Empire.

During the Polish–Soviet War, the area was annexed by Poland. The Council of Ambassadors and the international community (with the exception of Lithuania) recognized Polish sovereignty over the Vilnus region in 1923. In 1923, the Wilno Voivodeship was created, which existed until 1939, when the Soviet Union occupied Lithuania and Poland and returned most, but not all, of the Polish-annexed land to Lithuania.

Demographics

In 1834, the Vilnius Governorate had about 789,000 inhabitants; by 1897, the population had grown to about 1,591,000 residents (37 per km2).  

Between 1944 and 1946, about 150,000 people, mostly but not all of Polish extraction left the area for Poland (about 10% of this group may have been Lithuanians hoping to escape Soviet rule). Between 1955 and 1959, another 46,000 Polish-speakers left Lithuania (see the Ethnic history of the Vilnius region).  Meanwhile, the Jewish population of the area, just as in the rest of Lithuania, was virtually exterminated by the Nazis during World War II.  As of 2001, ethnic Lithuanians once again predominated within the city of Vilnius (59%), but the area of the former governorate as a whole remained about 62% Polish, with the percentage of Russians (8.6) and Belarusians (4.4) having dwindled to a tiny minority.

Subdivisions

Ethnic composition
Russian authorities periodically performed censuses. However, they reported strikingly different numbers:

See also
Ethnic history of the Vilnius region
History of Vilnius
Wilno Voivodeship
Vileyka Voblast

References

 
Governorates of the Russian Empire
History of Vilnius
Historical regions in Lithuania
1795 establishments in the Russian Empire